Free China: The Courage to Believe is a 2012 documentary film (61 minutes) about the persecution of Falun Gong, starring Jennifer Zeng and Dr. Charles Lee.

Description
The film is based on a true story of a mother and former Communist Party member, Jennifer Zeng, who along with more than 70 million Chinese were practicing Falun Gong, a belief that combined Buddhism and Daoism until the Chinese Government outlawed it. The Internet police intercepted an email and Jennifer was imprisoned for her faith. As she endured physical and mental torture, she had to decide: does she stand her ground and languish in jail, or does she recant her belief so she can tell her story to the world and be reunited with her family?

A world away, Dr. Charles Lee, a Chinese American businessman, wanted to do his part to stop the persecution by attempting to broadcast uncensored information on state controlled television. He was arrested in China and sentenced to three years of re-education in a prison camp where he endured forced labor, making amongst other things, Homer Simpson slippers sold at stores throughout the US.

With more than one hundred thousand protests occurring each year inside China, unrest among Chinese people is building with the breaking of each political scandal. As China's prisoners of conscience are subjected to forced labor and possibly organ harvesting, but at this time it is unconfirmed. This timely documentary exposes profound issues such as genocide and unfair trade practices with the West. The film also highlights how new Internet technologies are helping bring freedom to more than 1.3 billion people living in China and other repressive regimes throughout the world.

Interviewees in the film
 Jennifer Zeng - author of Witnessing History: One Chinese Woman’s Fight for Freedom
 Dr. Charles Lee - Chinese American businessman and labor camp survivor 
 David Kilgour - human rights investigator and former Canadian Secretary of State (Asia-Pacific)
 Chris Smith - US Congressman and chair of the Congressional-Executive Commission on China
 Ethan Gutmann - China analyst, human rights investigator, author of The Slaughter: Mass Killings, Organ Harvesting, and China's Secret Solution to Its Dissident Problem and Losing The New China: A Story of Commerce, Desire, and Betrayal. Contributor for The Wall Street Journal Asia

Awards and other information
The film won awards at 8 film festivals, including American INSIGHT's 2012 Free Speech Film Festival and WorldFest's 2012 Film Festival.

The film was produced and directed by awarding winning filmmakers Kean Wong and Michael Perlman. 
The film has screened at over 700 private venues including the UK, European and Israeli parliaments and the US Congress. The film will be available in over 20 languages by the end of 2014.

The soundtrack, trailers, and DVDs of the film are available on the Free China website.

The most recent screenings of the film were on 5–7 December 2014 in Taiwan.

The online premiere was on 3 February 2015.

See also

Persecution of Falun Gong
Documentaries about the Persecution of Falun Gong
Organ harvesting from Falun Gong practitioners in China

References

External links
 Official Website freechina.ntdtv.org
 

2012 films
Documentary films about human rights
Falun Gong